Darjo Xhuti (born 9 May 1991) is an Albanian professional footballer who plays as a midfielder.

Club career
Xhuti initially came on trial at Albanian Superliga side Tirana at the end of 2012. He also scored in a friendly against Vllaznia Shkodër which ended 2–0 his side. He successfully passed the trial, and on 30 January 2013, Xhuti was presented as the new player of Tirana, signing a contract until the end of the season. He was given squad number 22. Xhuti made his first Tirana appearance by appearing in the last minutes of the goalless away draw against Laçi in the final championship round. That was his only appearance of the season, as Tirana finished the championship in 5th place. Xhuti left the club on 1 June after his contract run out.

Personal life
Xhuti emigrated to Greece along with his family at a very young age.

Career statistics

Club

References

1991 births
Living people
Footballers from Korçë
Albanian footballers
Association football midfielders
KF Tirana players
Kategoria Superiore players
Albanian expatriate sportspeople in Greece